Tallulah Falls School is a private boarding and day school located in the town of Tallulah Falls, Georgia, United States, within Habersham and Rabun Counties. The school is located on a wooded campus in northeast Georgia on the southern slopes of Cherokee Mountain at the foothills of the Appalachian chain. The school was founded in 1909 by Mary Ann Lipscomb of Athens.

The school is listed on the National Register of Historic Places.

In the fall of 2014, TFS opened its expanded and renovated Upper School academic building. On the same day as the dedication, school officials broke ground on a new gymnasium project on the middle school campus. The $4.5 million structure was slated for completion in the fall of 2016.

In the Summer of 2017, construction began on a natatorium complex featuring a competition-sized pool with bleacher seating for 240 people.

References

External links
 
 
 

Boarding schools in Georgia (U.S. state)
Educational institutions established in 1909
Schools in Habersham County, Georgia
Private high schools in Georgia (U.S. state)
School buildings on the National Register of Historic Places in Georgia (U.S. state)
Private middle schools in Georgia (U.S. state)
1909 establishments in Georgia (U.S. state)
Historic districts on the National Register of Historic Places in Georgia (U.S. state)
National Register of Historic Places in Habersham County, Georgia